Kuthukalvalasai is a neighborhood located in Tenkasi, Tamil Nadu, India, 1 km away from District headquarters Tenkasi. It is located at the foot of the Western Ghats and Courtallam hills.

References

External links

Villages in Tirunelveli district